Sanguirana sanguinea is a species of frog in the family Ranidae. It is found in Sulawesi, Indonesia and Palawan, the Philippines.

Its natural habitats are subtropical or tropical moist lowland forests, subtropical or tropical swamps, rivers, swamps, intermittent freshwater marshes, rural gardens, and heavily degraded former forest. It is not considered threatened by the IUCN.

References

sanguinea
Amphibians described in 1893
Amphibians of Indonesia
Amphibians of the Philippines
Taxonomy articles created by Polbot